George Dobson ( – ) was an English professional rugby league footballer who played in the 1900s, 1910s and 1920s.

Background
George Dobson was born in Barrow-in-Furness, Lancashire, England, and his death aged 63 was registered in Barrow-in-Furness, Lancashire, England.

Playing career

County honours
George Dobson won a cap for Lancashire while at Barrow in 1912 against Yorkshire.

Testimonial match

George Dobson's Testimonial match at Barrow took place against a Harold Wagstaff Select XIII team at Little Park, Roose, Barrow-in-Furness on Saturday 29 April 1922.

Career records
George Dobson is thirteenth in Barrow's all time try scorers list with 101-tries.

Honoured at Barrow Raiders
George Dobson is a Barrow Raiders Hall of Fame inductee.

References

External links
Search for "Dobson" at rugbyleagueproject.org

(archived by web.archive.org) Hall of Fame at barrowrlfc.com
Search for "George Dobson" at britishnewspaperarchive.co.uk

1890s births
1950s deaths
Year of birth uncertain
Year of death uncertain
Barrow Raiders players
English rugby league players
Lancashire rugby league team players
Place of death missing
Rugby league centres
Rugby league players from Barrow-in-Furness